Mughlai paratha is a popular Bengali street food 
of soft fried bread enhanced by a stuffing of keema (minced meat), egg, onions and pepper; or a paratha stuffed with the same or similar ingredients.
It is believed to have originated in Bengal Subah during the time of Mughal Empire as a derivative of the Turkish Gözleme. The dish is believed to be prepared for the royal court of Mughal Emperor Jahangir.

History
Mughlai paratha  was one of those Mughlai recipes that entered in Bengali cuisine during the Mughal Empire. It is believed that the Mughlai paratha originated during Mughal emperor Jahangir's reign and it was a creation of his cook Adil Hafiz Usman, who originally hailed from the Bardhaman district of West Bengal of Hadhrami Arab descent. It is likely a derivative of the Turkish Gözleme. Mughal rule mostly influenced the cuisine of the administrative capitals of Bengal Subah, like Murshidabad and Dhaka, rather than the rural part of it. The dish traveled to Kolkata in West Bengal from old capitals of Bengal Subah like Murshidabad and Dhaka, after Kolkata became the capital of newly formed Bengal presidency under British Raj and the dish became a very common and popular street snack of Kolkata.

Ingredients
Ingredients in the preparation of Mughlai paratha may include whole-wheat flour, ghee, eggs, finely chopped onions, chopped green chili pepper and chopped coriander leaves.

Sometimes chicken or mutton keema is also used in some variants. It can also be served without meat for stuffing.

See also

 Bangladeshi cuisine
 List of Bangladeshi dishes
 Indian cuisine
 List of Indian dishes
 List of street foods

References

Flatbread dishes
Mughlai cuisine
Bangladeshi cuisine